Graeme Wilder Stinson (born August 6, 1997) is an American professional baseball pitcher in the Tampa Bay Rays organization.

Amateur career
Stinson attended Norcross High School in Norcross, Georgia, where he played on the school's varsity baseball team all four years. In 2015, the summer before his senior year, he played in the Under Armour All-America Baseball Game at Wrigley Field. As a senior, he pitched to a 7-0 record with a 1.88 ERA in  innings. Undrafted out of high school in the 2016 Major League Baseball draft, he enrolled at Duke University to play college baseball for the Duke Blue Devils.

As a freshman at Duke in 2017, Stinson struggled, posting a 3-1 record with a 6.67 ERA in 12 games (nine starts), although he did strike out 45 batters in  innings pitched. He played for the Orleans Firebirds of the Cape Cod Baseball League that summer, pitching to a 2.45 ERA in  innings. Stinson broke out as a sophomore in 2018, going 5-1 with a 1.89 ERA, striking out 98 batters in 62 innings while only walking 19 in 23 games (four starts). After the season, he once again returned to the Cape Cod League along with playing for the USA Baseball Collegiate National Team. Prior to the 2019 season, Stinson was named a Preseason All-American by D1Baseball, Collegiate Baseball, and Perfect Game. Stinson was considered one of the top prospects for the 2019 Major League Baseball draft but his stock fell after he missed nearly all of the 2019 season due to injury, compiling a 4.58 ERA in five starts on the year.

Professional career
Stinson was selected by the Tampa Bay Rays in the fourth round with the 128th overall pick of the 2019 Major League Baseball draft and signed for $444,400. He made his professional debut with the Rookie-level Gulf Coast Rays, appearing in one game. He did not play a minor league game in 2020 due to the cancellation of the minor league season caused by the COVID-19 pandemic. For the 2021 season, he was assigned to the Charleston RiverDogs of the Low-A East, going 2-0 with a 5.55 ERA and 39 strikeouts over  innings. He opened the 2022 season with the Bowling Green Hot Rods of the High-A South Atlantic League. In late July, he was promoted to the Montgomery Biscuits of the Double-A Southern League, was demoted back to Bowling Green in early August, and was promoted back to Montgomery near the season's end. Over forty relief appearances between the two teams, he went 5-2 with a 4.26 ERA, 84 strikeouts, and thirty walks over  innings.

References

External links

Duke Blue Devils bio

1997 births
Living people
Baseball players from Atlanta
Baseball pitchers
United States national baseball team players
Duke Blue Devils baseball players
Orleans Firebirds players
Gulf Coast Rays players
Charleston RiverDogs players
Bowling Green Hot Rods players